The Sitka History Museum, formerly known as the Isabel Miller Museum is the city museum of Sitka in the U.S. state of Alaska.

The Sitka Historical Society & Museum is located in the Harrigan Centennial Hall in downtown Sitka. Its collection focuses on Sitka's history from the Tlingit people, through the European explorations and Russian era and after.  The museum also has extensive collections and archives not on display, accessible by staff for research purposes.

External links
 Official site

Museums in Sitka, Alaska
History museums in Alaska